Euchaetes expressa is a moth of the family Erebidae. It was described by Henry Edwards in 1884. It is found in Mexico and Costa Rica.

References

 Arctiidae genus list at Butterflies and Moths of the World of the Natural History Museum

Phaegopterina
Moths described in 1884